The Kontinental Hockey League (KHL) is an international professional ice hockey league founded in 2008. It comprises member clubs based in Russia (19), Belarus (1), Kazakhstan (1) and China (1) for a total of 22 clubs.

It was considered in 2015 to be the premier professional ice hockey league in Europe and Asia, and the second-strongest in the world behind North America's National Hockey League. The KHL had in 2017 the highest total attendance in Europe with 5.32 million spectators in the regular season and third-highest average attendance in Europe with 6,121 spectators per game in the regular season.  The Gagarin Cup is awarded annually to the league's playoff champion at the end of each season. The title of Champion of Russia is given to the highest-ranked Russian team.

History

History

The league formed from the Russian Superleague (RSL) and the champion of the 2007–08 season of the second division, with 24 teams: 21 from Russia and one each from Belarus, Latvia, and Kazakhstan. The teams were divided into four divisions, based on the performance in previous seasons.

The start of the fourth season was overshadowed by the 2011 Lokomotiv Yaroslavl plane crash on 7 September 2011 in which almost all members of the team Lokomotiv Yaroslavl lost their lives shortly after take-off for their flight to their season-opening game in Minsk. The Opening Cup game in Ufa, which was already underway when news of the disaster arrived, was suspended. In memory of the disaster, 7 September remained a day of mourning on which no KHL regular-season games took place, until after the 2017–18 KHL season. Journalist Vsevolod Kukushkin acted as the first press secretary for the league, after it evolved from the Superleague.

After the 2022 Russian invasion of Ukraine, the National Hockey League suspended operation of its Memorandum of Understanding with the KHL. An NHL memo instructed NHL teams to "immediately cease all dealings [direct or indirect] with the KHL and KHL Clubs [and all representatives of both], as well as with player agents who are based in and continue to do business in Russia."

Team changes

2009–2014
In the 2009–10 season, Avtomobilist Yekaterinburg joined the KHL and Khimik Voskresensk was transferred to a lower league. In the 2010–11 season, Yugra Khanty-Mansiysk joined the league.

After several attempts by teams from Central Europe and Scandinavia to join the KHL, expansion beyond the borders of the former Soviet Union was finally realized in 2011. Lev Poprad, a newly founded team based in Poprad, Slovakia was admitted to the league. But after only one season, Lev was replaced by a team of the same name, Lev Praha, from Prague, Czech Republic, while Slovan Bratislava from Bratislava, Slovakia and Ukraine's Donbass from Donetsk joined the KHL as expansion teams for the 2012–13 season. Lev and Slovan qualified for the playoffs in their first KHL season.

In 2013, Medveščak from Zagreb, Croatia, previously playing in the Austrian Hockey League, and Russian expansion team Admiral Vladivostok joined the league, thus expanding the league even further. The league comprised 28 teams during the 2013–14 season, of which 21 were based in Russia and 7 located in the other countries.

In 2014, Finnish team Jokerit from Helsinki, Lada Togliatti (which previously played in the league), and newly created team HC Sochi joined the league. However, HC Donbass did not play in the league for the 2014–15 season, due to the Russian intervention in Ukraine, but had intended to rejoin later. Two other teams, Lev Praha and Spartak Moscow, also withdrew from the 2014–15 season due to financial problems.

2015–2019
Prior to the 2015–16 season, Atlant Moscow Oblast withdrew from the KHL due to financial issues, while Spartak Moscow returned after a one-year hiatus. The newly created Chinese club HC Kunlun Red Star from Beijing was admitted for the 2016–17 season.

Prior to the 2017–18 season, Medveščak Zagreb withdrew from the league to rejoin the Austrian league and Metallurg Novokuznetsk was sent down to the VHL.

After the end of the 2018–19 season, HC Slovan Bratislava withdrew from the KHL due to financial issues to rejoin the Slovak Tipsport Liga.

2020–present
On 24 February 2022, Finnish club Jokerit announced the team would withdraw from the league for the remainder of the season, including the playoffs, due to the 2022 Russian invasion of Ukraine. On 27 February 2022, Latvian club Dinamo Riga announced that they too would withdraw for the same reasons.

Season structure

Since 2009, the league has been divided into East and West conferences. In the current season, both conferences include 12 teams divided into two divisions of 6 teams. Each team plays four games against each division opponent (20), three games against each non-division conference opponent (18), and two games against each non-conference opponent (24) for a total of 62 games.

The eight top-ranked teams in each conference receive playoff berths. Within each conference quarterfinals, semifinals and finals are played before the conference winners play against each other for the Gagarin Cup. The division winners are seeded first and second in their conference, based on their regular-season record. All playoff rounds are played as best-of-seven series. In each round, the top-seeded remaining team is paired with the lowest-seeded team, etc.

In the 2012–13 season, the Nadezhda Cup (Cup of Hope) was introduced, a consolation tournament for the teams who did not qualify for the playoffs. The winning team in the tournament wins the first overall pick in the KHL Junior Draft. The tournament is intended to extend the season and help maintain interest in hockey in the cities of these teams, and help players of national teams prepare for upcoming World Championships.

Teams

Kontinental Hockey League on Google Maps

Former KHL Teams

Players

Though now not as restrictive in maintaining an exclusively Russian composition of players and teams, Russian teams are still not allowed to sign more than five foreign players, while non-Russian teams must have at least five players from their respective countries. Foreign goaltenders on Russian teams are subject to a limit regarding their total seasonal ice time.

Prior to the inaugural season, several KHL teams signed several players from the NHL. A dispute between the two leagues over some of these signings was supposed to have been resolved by an agreement signed on 10 July 2008, whereby each league would honor the contracts of the other, but the signing of Alexander Radulov was made public one day after the agreement (though it was actually signed two days prior to the agreement taking effect), leading to an investigation by the International Ice Hockey Federation. On 4 October 2010, the conflict between the leagues was settled when both signed a new agreement to honor one another's contracts.

The league set up rules for the NHL lockout which lasted from 16 September 2012 to 12 January 2013. According to the special regulations, each KHL team was allowed to add up to three NHL players to its roster, with only one foreign player allowed. More than 40 NHL players, the majority of them Russians, played in the KHL during the lockout.

KHL players are represented by the Kontinental Hockey League Players' Trade Union.

After the 2022 Russian invasion of Ukraine, some non-Russian players elected to leave their teams, at the risk of forfeiting their salaries. The departing players included former NHL forwards Markus Granlund, Nick Shore, Geoff Platt, Kenny Agostino, Teemu Hartikainen, Philip Larsen, Sakari Manninen, Harri Sateri, Jyrki Jokipakka, Joakim Nordstrom, Lucas Wallmark, and Juho Olkinuora.

Nationalities of players

During the 2013–2014 season, players representing 16 nations played at least one game in the KHL. A player's nationality is for various reasons sometimes ambiguous. For the table presented below, the nationality "is determined based on the last country that the player represented in international competition. If a player has never played for a national team, usually the country of birth is chosen as the player nationality, unless there is strong evidence indicating otherwise". For players born in former Soviet republics, the situation is often more complex due to dual citizenship and naturalization. Therefore, a list of players born in Ukraine gives case-by-case details for some of those players. In some cases, players can change their nationality registration with the league on a year-by-year basis, and their nationality with the league may not match that of their International Ice Hockey Federation registration. Non-Russians represented about 30–35% of the KHL players and were mostly Central European, Nordic, and North American. In 2015–16, more than 950 players played in the league (see table below). Russian teams are limited to a maximum of 5 foreign players per squad.

 a – For further information, see: List of Ukrainians in the KHL

Trophies and awards 

The winner of the playoff is awarded the Gagarin Cup. The highest placed Russian team is awarded the title of the Russian champion. The team ranked first in the standings after the regular season, i.e. the winner of the regular season, is awarded the Continental Cup. The winners of the conference finals are awarded the Eastern Conference Champion Cup and the Western Conference Champion Cup.

The KHL presents annual awards to its most successful players.  The KHL also awards the Opening Cup annually to the winner of the first game between the Gagarin Cup winner and the runner-up of the previous season. On 10 September 2011, three days after the 2011 Lokomotiv Yaroslavl plane crash, the KHL head office decided to honor the deceased in the 2011 Opening Cup. The League gives the Andrey Starovoytov Award annually to its referees of the year, also called the "Golden Whistle".

Seasons overview

*: In the first season, Salavat Yulaev Ufa was the winner of the regular season, but the Continental Cup was not yet awarded.

Statistics

Single season records

Regular season

Playoffs

Career records

Regular season

Playoffs

KHL's longest match

All-time team records
Since its foundation in 2008, 35 different clubs have played in the KHL, with 32 having qualified for at least one postseason. Of the 24 founding teams, only Metallurg Novokuznetsk and Khimik Voskresensk had never qualified for the playoffs (both are no longer in the league). The table gives the final regular-season ranks for all teams, with the playoff performance encoded in colors. The teams are ordered by their best championship results.

 [a]: Includes record of Dynamo Moscow before the merger with HC MVD in 2010

 [b]: Did not participate in the 2011–12 season due to the 2011 Lokomotiv Yaroslavl plane crash of 7 September 2011, that killed the entire team

 [c]: Conference semifinals cancelled due to the COVID-19 pandemic

Attendance statistics

Total and average attendance by season, including play-offs:

All-Star Game
 
The Kontinental Hockey League All-Star Game is an exhibition game held annually at the midway point (usually January or February) of the season, with the league's star players playing against each other. Previously played in a "Russian players versus the rest of the world" format, now it is Eastern versus Western Conference.

See also
 Ice Hockey Federation of Russia
 List of Soviet and Russian ice hockey champions
 List of Soviet and Russian ice hockey scoring champions
 List of Soviet and Russian ice hockey goal scoring champions
 List of current KHL team rosters

References

External links 
Official KHL
 Official website
  
  
  
 

Third party
 KHL vs NHL exhibition games official homepage
 KHL news and stats from Eurohockey
 Kontinental Hockey League Players' Trade Union 

 
1
1
1
Sports leagues established in 2008
Sports leagues in Russia
2008 establishments in Russia
Professional ice hockey leagues in Belarus
Professional ice hockey leagues in China
Professional ice hockey leagues in Russia
Multi-national professional sports leagues
Top tier ice hockey leagues
Organizations based in Moscow